Fallopia aubertii (syn. Polygonum aubertii) is a species of flowering plant in the knotweed family Polygonaceae.

Description

Distribution

References

External links

aubertii
Flora of China
Plants described in 1883